Manchester Airport is an international airport in Ringway, Manchester, England.

Manchester Airport may also refer to:

United Kingdom
Trafford Park Aerodrome (Manchester), in operation 1911–18
Alexandra Park Aerodrome (Manchester), in operation 1918–24
Woodford Aerodrome or Manchester Woodford Aerodrome, in operation 1924–2011, a private aerodrome in Stockport, England
Manchester (Wythenshawe) Aerodrome, the first municipally-owned airport at Manchester, 1929–30
City Airport Manchester, or Barton Aerodrome, a general aviation airport in Salford, England in operation since 1930

United States
Manchester–Boston Regional Airport, a public airport in Manchester, New Hampshire, United States